La Alameda Park is a park in Quito.

This park is shaped like a triangle bounded by the streets Gran Colombia, Sodiro and 10 de Agosto. It is the oldest park in the city, its composition dates from 1596 with an area of 6.3 hectares. The park is also known as 'Chuquihuada'.

The park houses the "Churo," one of the oldest towns in the area, dating back to colonial times. The name "churo" refers to the shape of a snail.

Inside of this park was established the Quito Astronomical Observatory in 1864, the first astronomical observatory in South America.  At the time of the construction it was the most gifted of South America and still has the instrumentation of the time. The park is filled with monuments. Some of the more famous among these are the sculpture built in honor of the French Geodesic Mission and to Bolivar.

The Alameda Park is a true tradition of Quito, with its natural lagoon becomes a place of relaxation for the inhabitants of the city. The park keeps inside trees that have stood the time, we can find palm trees, acacias, redwoods, toct, cedar and ash. The oldest tree of Alameda is a 120 years old macrocarpa cypress.

In 1963, The Government of Ecuador transferred title of the Observatory to the National Polytechnic School.

One of the oldest observatories in South America is the Quito Astronomical Observatory. 
and located 12 minutes south of the Equator in Quito, Ecuador.  The Quito Astronomical Observatory is the National Observatory of Ecuador and is located in the Historic Center of Quito and is managed by the EPN.

The Quito Astronomical Observatory is a research institute of EPN, the National Polytechnic School in Quito, Ecuador. Its major research fields are astronomy and atmospheric physics.

Activities and services at the Quito Astronomical Observatory at La Alameda Park

One of the Oldest Observatories in South America is the Quito Astronomical Observatory.
Perfect for tourists and a short drive to all the hotels, The Quito Astronomical Observatory has been perfectly restored and is open for tourists.

The activities and services currently provided by the OAQ are:

 Night observations by telescopes

 Museum

The Quito Astronomical Observatory is a research institute of EPN, the National Polytechnic School in Quito, Ecuador. Its major research fields are astronomy and atmospheric physics.

References

Parks in Quito
1596 establishments in South America